Constantin 'Tică' Oțet (24 December 1940 – 19 February 1999) was a Romanian football coach.

Career
He was born in 1940 in Poroina, a village in Șimian commune,  Mehedinți County. In 1959, Oțet began playing for Metalul Turnu Severin but several injuries forced him to end his playing career early at the age of 23. He won as manager the Juniors Romanian Championship in seasons 1968/69 and 1975/76, and as the second coach won the club's first league title in season 1973-1974. In the years 1969-1977 also worked as a teacher at the faculty of physical education and sport at the University of Craiova. As the second coach of FC Argeș Pitești won the Romanian championship in the 1978-1979 season, and in the 1980-1981 season as the second coach of Universitatea Craiova. He won the Romanian Cup in 1983 as head coach of Universitatea Craiova he also reached the UEFA Cup semi-finals in 1982. In the season 1989-1990 he promoted lower league side Constructorul Craiova to Divizia B. In 1990-1993 he worked as director of the Center for Children and Youth Universitatea Craiova. Then, with the Egyptian club won the Hosni Mubarak Cup. In the season 1995/1996 again worked as director of the Center for Children and Youth Universitatea Craiova. In the first round of the season 1996/1997 occupied the post of technical director for Universitatea Craiova, in the second half of the season 1996/1997 he occupied the post of technical director for Al Nassr FC (won the Gulf Club Champions Cup). In the first round of the season 1996/1997 once again began the post of technical director Universitatea Craiova. In the second half of the season 1997/1998 with the Syrian club Al-Jaish SC (Damascus) won the championship and reached the final of the Arab Cup Winners' Cup.

He died on February 19, 1999.

Graduate IEFS Bucharest, coach emeritus. 
Honorary Citizen of the City of Craiova.

Honours

Manager 
Universitatea Craiova
Romanian Cup: 1982–83

Al-Jaish Damascus
Syrian League: 1998–99
Arab Cup Winners' Cup Runner-up: 1999

Assistant manager 
Universitatea Craiova
Romanian League: 1973–74, 1980–81
Romanian Cup: 1976–77, 1980–81

Argeș Pitești 
Romanian League: 1978–79

References

External links
Librarie.net

1940 births
1999 deaths
Romanian footballers
Romanian football managers
CS Pandurii Târgu Jiu managers
CS Universitatea Craiova managers
CS Minerul Motru managers
FC U Craiova 1948 managers
CSM Jiul Petroșani managers
Romanian expatriates in Egypt
Expatriate football managers in Egypt
Romanian expatriate sportspeople in Syria
Expatriate football managers in Syria
Romanian expatriate football managers
Association footballers not categorized by position
People from Mehedinți County